The following is a list of members of the Green Party of Aotearoa New Zealand members of Parliament (MPs). The Green Party of Aotearoa New Zealand was founded in 1990. It first won parliamentary representation in 1996 as a member party of the Alliance. Two of the three Green MPs elected that year split from the Alliance in 1997 and the Greens have retained a presence in the New Zealand House of Representatives continuously until the present day.

Notes
†:Died in office

Sources
Appendices to the Journals of the House of Representatives, H33 and/or E9, various years. E9s since 1994 are available here.

Green MPs